Pocky & Rocky 2, released in Japan as , is a shoot 'em up video game developed and published by Natsume in Japan and North America, and published in PAL regions by Ocean Software for the Super NES video game console. It is the sequel to Pocky & Rocky.

Gameplay

The game is played in a top-down view, featuring many elements from classic shoot 'em up games but giving the player free eight-directional movement. Player one controls the main protagonist, Pocky, who attacks by throwing ofuda talismans (referred to as "cards" in English versions). Pocky can pick up items to improve her attack power and new clothes to protect herself from damage, as well as throw player 2's character and use magic. Player 2 assumes a supporting role as one of Pocky's friends each possessing a unique attack and unlimited lives. If there is no second player, the supporting character will be CPU-controlled.

Pocky can use Player 2's character as a utility in various ways. Using "magic", she can force herself into her partner's mind and control their body for a short time, enabling unique abilities depending on who she possesses. Additionally, she can throw her partner at enemies to attack, doing massive damage to the enemy but temporarily killing the thrown character. This exploitation of player 2 is a departure from the previous game, in which player 1 and Player 2 had similar powers and were equally valuable.

Reception
The four reviewers of Electronic Gaming Monthly gave the game rave reviews, praising the additional characters with unique abilities, the graphics, and the gameplay design. Though one of the reviewers voiced dislike for the fact that the other characters act as mere subordinates to Pocky, they gave it unanimous scores of 8 out of 10 each. GamePro likewise praised the additional characters with the new strategy they add, the graphics, and the cute design. They particularly noted that "even the tiniest animals and items display precise detail". Out of 5, the review rated it 4.5 for graphics, 3.5 for sound, 4.5 for control and 5.0 for fun factor.

VideoGames selected as a runner-up for the Best Adventure Game award. IGN ranked the game 73rd on its "Top 100 SNES Games of All Time."

References

1994 video games
Pocky & Rocky
Ocean Software games
Natsume (company) games
Super Nintendo Entertainment System games
Super Nintendo Entertainment System-only games
Video game sequels
Video games about raccoons
Video games about ninja
Video games set in feudal Japan
Video games scored by Kinuyo Yamashita
Video games scored by Hiroyuki Iwatsuki
Video games developed in Japan
Multiplayer and single-player video games